Kemenuh Butterfly Park is a park with butterflies in Kemenuh, Sukawati, Gianyar, Bali, Indonesia. It is located among rice fields.

This park focuses on conservation and education as well as being an attraction for tourists and locals to enjoy.

The endangered kupu-kupu barong moth is found at the cocoon house in this park.

References 

Gianyar Regency
Parks in Indonesia 
Tourist attractions in Bali
Butterfly houses